Det Norske Solistkor (The Norwegian soloists' choir) is a professional choral ensemble founded in Oslo in 1950 by the composer Knut Nystedt in collaboration with Kåre Siem. Nystedt conducted the group until 1990, when he was succeeded by Grete Pedersen. It is formed of today 26 singers, varied in performance depending on the literature.

The ensemble is the only professional choir in Norway besides the chorus of the Oslo Opera. They have toured to France, Germany, the U.S., Korea, China and Israel.

Discography 
The ensemble has made recordings. A recording of Bach's motets on BIS was awarded the Diapason d'Or in 2018.

References

External links 
 
 
 
 Det Norske Solistkor (Choir) Bach Cantatas Website 2017
 Det Norske Solistkor tidal.com
 Det Norske Solistkor BIS

Norwegian choirs
1950 establishments in Norway